Cheakamus Mountain is a  glacier-clad peak located in the Garibaldi Ranges of the Coast Mountains, in Garibaldi Provincial Park of southwestern British Columbia, Canada. It is the fourth-highest peak of the Fitzsimmons Range, which is a subset of the Garibaldi Ranges. The Diavolo Glacier spreads out below the north aspect of the peak, and precipitation runoff from the peak with meltwater from the glacier drains into tributaries of the Cheakamus River. The peak was named in association with the river, which in turn is anglicized from Tseearkamisht, a Squamish word meaning "people who use the cedar rope fishing net". The mountain's name was officially adopted on September 2, 1930, by the Geographical Names Board of Canada. The first ascent of the mountain was made in 1950 by Roy Hooley, Jimmy Kilborn, and Ian Kirk.

Climate

Based on the Köppen climate classification, Cheakamus Mountain is located in the marine west coast climate zone of western North America. Most weather fronts originate in the Pacific Ocean, and travel east toward the Coast Mountains where they are forced upward by the range (Orographic lift), causing them to drop their moisture in the form of rain or snowfall. As a result, the Coast Mountains experience high precipitation, especially during the winter months in the form of snowfall. Temperatures can drop below −20 °C with wind chill factors below −30 °C. The months July through September offer the most favorable weather for climbing Cheakamus Mountain.

See also

 Geography of British Columbia
 Geology of British Columbia

References

External links
 Weather: Cheakamus Mountain

Garibaldi Ranges
Two-thousanders of British Columbia
Pacific Ranges
Sea-to-Sky Corridor
New Westminster Land District